Aziz Sergeyevich Shavershian (24 March 1989 – 5 August 2011), better known as Zyzz, was a Russian-born Australian bodybuilder, personal trainer and model. He established a cult following after posting multiple videos of himself on YouTube, starting in 2007.

In July 2011, Shavershian gained more media attention when The Sydney Morning Herald published an article about the arrest of his older brother, Said, for illegal possession of anabolic steroids. On 5 August 2011, while on holiday in Thailand, Aziz suffered a heart attack and died at the age of 22.

Biography
Shavershian, an ethnic Kurd born in Moscow, was the youngest son of Maiane Iboian, who works in cardiology, and Sergei Shavershian. He had one older brother, Said Shavershian, who is also known by the screen name "Chestbrah". In 1993, Shavershian and his family moved to Australia. He was raised in Eastwood, New South Wales, and attended Marist College Eastwood secondary school, where he achieved Dux of the college. Prior to his death in August 2011, he was set to graduate from the University of Western Sydney, with a degree in business and commerce. He was an atheist,  though he wore a rosary and his grave is adorned with a cross.

Bodybuilding
Before becoming a bodybuilder, Shavershian had been described as a "skinny kid" and an ectomorph. Once he completed secondary school, inspired by his bodybuilder brother, he joined a local gym and began learning about nutrition and training, applying it to his pursuit of becoming a bodybuilder. He would spend three to four hours a day training in the gym. His favourite professional bodybuilders included Arnold Schwarzenegger and Frank Zane.

In an interview with bodybuilding website Simplyshredded.com, Shavershian recalled that he originally wanted to become a bodybuilder to "impress girls". He said he would look at pictures of "shredded" bodybuilders and tell himself that he would one day be like them. Almost four years into training, he stated that: 

Shavershian was the poster boy of a subculture of amateur bodybuilding in Australia, dubbed "aesthetics", which he had made popular. He had established his own protein label, Protein of the Gods, released in June 2011. He also had a clothing line, and Zyzz's Bodybuilding Bible was released on 17 May 2011, based on a compilation of bodybuilding knowledge he had acquired over his four years of training. He asserted that the internet helped build up his brand, and it was ultimately made possible through the use of social media.

On 14 July 2011, Shavershian's brother Said was arrested for possession of anabolic steroids, to which he pleaded guilty after Aziz's death. The Sydney Morning Herald covered the case, and included a photo of Shavershian. He objected to the use of his picture to illustrate what was essentially an article on the misuse of anabolic steroids.

When asked by The Daily Telegraph, Shavershian denied ever using steroids, and claimed that his physique was the result of hard work in the gym and a strict diet. According to The Sydney Morning Herald, the company which employed Shavershian as a stripper maintained that he was "a lovely guy, aside from the steroids". Shavershian often used phrases such as "riding bicycles", which, according to The Daily Telegraph, is "gym slang for using a cycle of steroids".

Death
On 5 August 2011, Shavershian suffered a heart attack in a sauna, while on vacation in Pattaya. He was taken to a hospital, where doctors were unable to revive him. His family and friends placed news of his death on Facebook. His death was confirmed on 9 August 2011 by the Department of Foreign Affairs and Trade (DFAT). An autopsy revealed a previously undiagnosed congenital heart defect and cardiomegaly which triggered cardiac arrest. His family stated he had shown several minor symptoms in the few months leading up to August 2011, including high blood pressure and occasional shortness of breath. He had a family history of heart problems.

Legacy
According to the Sydney Morning Herald, Shavershian's death was the sixth most searched death-related topic in Australia during 2011. Before his death, Shavershian had posted a video of himself on a social networking site, which would later come out 18th on Nine News's "Top News Videos of the Year" for 2011. Over the May 2011 to May 2012 period, Google statistics showed that he was searched as many times as Julia Gillard, the Prime Minister of Australia at that time.

At the 2012 New Year's Day Field Day festival in Sydney, people dressed up as Shavershian in a tribute to him.

Said Shavershian created a 19-minute tribute video for his brother, entitled Zyzz - The Legacy, and released it on YouTube on 22 March 2012. The video had been "trending the charts" on YouTube from late March to early April 2012. As of February 2022, the video has over 15 million views. Shavershian's followers still frequently post tribute videos dedicated to him, with a lot of them collecting over a million views.

At one point, Shavershian's Facebook page had 415,767 likes. In April 2012, The Daily Telegraph noted that his fan page had over 399,671 fans before becoming inactive a few months later.

According to a 2013 opinion piece in the Wentworth Courier, whilst hundreds of Wentworth Courier news articles published online have "disappeared into the void" since 2011, the "Zyzz story" continued "to be read and frequently appears in the daily list of most clicked-on articles on the Wentworth Courier website".

In a report on organized crime's control of the underground steroid trade, reporter Mark Willacy called Shavershian the "pin-up boy for the bodybuilding crowd."

In November 2022, Flume covered Bag Raiders' song, "Shooting Stars", with Shavershian's older brother, Said (known publicly as Chestbrah) for Triple J's "Like a Version". In the cover, Chestbrah enters from behind Flume, and "muzzes out," the dance Zyzz made famous, in honour of Aziz.

Filmography

References

1989 births
2011 deaths
Australian atheists
Australian bodybuilders
Australian male models
Russian emigrants to Australia
Models from Sydney
Russian atheists
Russian bodybuilders
Russian YouTubers
Russian male models
Australian YouTubers
Australian exercise instructors
Australian exercise and fitness writers
Sportspeople from Moscow
Western Sydney University alumni
Russian people of Kurdish descent
Australian people of Kurdish descent
Health and fitness YouTubers